There are eight capital cities in Australia, each of which functions as the seat of government for the state or territory in which it is located. One of these, Canberra, is also the national capital. Section 125 of the Constitution of Australia specified that the seat of the national government, that is, the national capital, would be in its own territory within New South Wales, at least  from Sydney. The Constitution specified that until this national capital was ready, the Parliament would sit in Melbourne. In 1927, the national capital was finally ready and the national government relocated from its former seat in Melbourne to Canberra within the Australian Capital Territory (or the Federal Capital Territory as it was known at the time).

In each state and internal territory, the capital is also the jurisdiction's most populous city. The Australian external territory of Norfolk Island has its official capital at Kingston, although this acts merely as the administrative centre of government; its de facto capital is Burnt Pine.

References

External links 

 
Demographics of Australia
Australia
Capital cities